Cynometra bourdillonii is a species of plant in the family Fabaceae. It is found only in Karnataka and Kerala in India. It is threatened by habitat loss.

References

bourdillonii
Flora of Karnataka
Flora of Kerala
Endangered plants
Taxonomy articles created by Polbot